Senator Braun may refer to:

United States
Members of the U.S. Senate:
Carol Moseley Braun (1947-), senator from Illinois (1993-1999)
Mike Braun (1954-), senator from Indiana (2019-)

Members of state senates:
John E. Braun (1967-), Washington State Senator (2013-)
Warren Braun (1934-), Wisconsin State Senator (1976- unknown year)